A blackhead is a blocked sweat/sebaceous duct of the skin known medically as an open comedo.

Blackhead may also refer to:

Places
 Blackhead (New Zealand), a cliff promontory to the south of Dunedin, New Zealand
 Blackhead Beach (Otago), close to the promontory
 Blackhead, Hawke's Bay, a settlement in Hawke's Bay, New Zealand
 Blackhead Bay, a bay in Newfoundland and Labrador, Canada
 A community in Small Point-Adam's Cove-Blackhead-Broad Cove, Newfoundland and Labrador, Canada
 Blackhead Mountains, a mountain range in the northern Catskills of New York, US
 Blackhead (New York), a peak in the Blackhead Range of mountains, New York, US
 Blackhead Point, also known as Tai Pau Mai, a cape in Hong Kong

Other uses
 Blackhead disease, or histomoniasis, which affects poultry

See also
 Brotherhood of Blackheads, a military order of unmarried merchants in historical Livonia
 Black Head (disambiguation)
 Black-headed caique (Pionites melanocephalus), a  small parrot of South America